Ranohon Amanova (born 8 August 1994, in Andijan) is an Uzbekistani swimmer. She swam at the 2012 Summer Olympics in the 200 m individual medley.

References 

1994 births
Living people
Uzbekistani female medley swimmers
Olympic swimmers of Uzbekistan
Swimmers at the 2012 Summer Olympics
Swimmers at the 2016 Summer Olympics
Swimmers at the 2010 Asian Games
People from Andijan
Swimmers at the 2014 Asian Games
Asian Games competitors for Uzbekistan
21st-century Uzbekistani women